is a railway station in the city of Yonezawa, Yamagata Prefecture, Japan, operated by East Japan Railway Company (JR East).

Lines
Minami-Yonezawa Station is served by the Yonesaka Line, and is located 3.1 rail kilometers from the terminus of the line at Yonezawa Station.

Station layout
The station has a single side platform serving traffic in both directions. The station is unattended.

History
Minami-Yonezawa Station opened on September 28, 1926. The station was absorbed into the JR East network upon the privatization of JNR on 1 April 1987. A new station building was completed in May 2011.

Surrounding area
 Yonezawa Jonan Post Office
Yamagata University Yonezawa campus

See also
List of Railway Stations in Japan

External links

 JR East Station information 

Railway stations in Yamagata Prefecture
Yonesaka Line
Railway stations in Japan opened in 1926
Stations of East Japan Railway Company
Yonezawa, Yamagata